Folkestad may refer to:

Folkestad (surname)
Folkestad, Bø
Folkestad Chapel